Kshitij is a masculine name that means horizon in Sanskrit, Hindi and Nepali:

Kshitij may refer to:

 Kshitij (film), a 1974 Indian film starring Helen and Bharat Kapoor
Kshitij (festival) , an annual techno-management fest of IIT Kharagpur
Kshitij English Boarding School, a private boarding school, Banepa, Nepal
Kshitij Wagh (born 1977), an Indian playback singer and a music composer
Kshitij Thakur (fl. 2009–2012), an Indian politician